The 2023 Winnipeg Blue Bombers season is scheduled to be the 65th season for the team in the Canadian Football League (CFL) and their 90th season overall. The Blue Bombers will attempt to qualify for the playoffs for the sixth consecutive season and win their 13th Grey Cup championship.

The 2023 CFL season scheduled to be the ninth season under head coach Mike O'Shea and the ninth full season under general manager Kyle Walters.

Offseason

CFL Global Draft
The 2023 CFL Global Draft is scheduled to take place in the spring of 2023. If the same format as the 2022 CFL Global Draft is used, the Blue Bombers will have three selections in the draft with the ninth-best odds to win the weighted draft lottery.

CFL National Draft
The 2023 CFL Draft is scheduled to take place in the spring of 2023. The Blue Bombers currently have eight selections in the eight-round draft and own all of their own selections by virtue of not trading any picks. The team is scheduled to have the eighth selection in each of the eight rounds of the draft (not including forfeited picks by other teams) after losing the 109th Grey Cup.

Preseason

Schedule

Regular season

Standings

Schedule

Team

Roster

Coaching staff

References

External links
 

Winnipeg Blue Bombers seasons
2023 Canadian Football League season by team
2023 in Manitoba